The 2017–18 Moldovan Cup was the 27th season of the annual Moldovan football cup competition. Sheriff Tiraspol entered as the defending champions after winning the 2016–17 edition. It began with the first preliminary round on 22 July 2017, and concluded with the final on 23 May 2018. The winner qualifies for the first qualifying round of the 2018–19 UEFA Europa League.

Format and schedule
Both preliminary rounds and the first two rounds proper were regionalised to reduce teams travel costs. All ties level after 90 minutes used extra time to determine the winner, with a penalty shoot-out to follow if necessary.

Participating teams
The following teams are qualified for the competition. Reserve teams are excluded.

Number in brackets denote the level of respective league in Football in Moldova. Teams in bold continue to the next round of the competition.

First preliminary round
28 clubs from the Divizia B entered this round. Teams that finished higher on the league in the previous season played their ties away. Cricova received a bye for the first preliminary round. All matches were played on 22 July 2017.

Second preliminary round
8 clubs from the Divizia B entered this round. Teams that finished higher on the league in the previous season played their ties away. All matches were played on 25 July 2017.Speranța Drochia, Rîșcani, Intersport Sănătăuca, FCM Ungheni, Socol Copceac, Fortuna Pleșeni and Olimp Comrat received a bye for the second preliminary round.

First round
The 11 winners from the preliminary rounds  joined the 11 Divizia A teams. In a match, the home advantage was granted to the team from the lower league. Matches were played on 12 and 13 August 2017.

Second round
The 8 winners from the previous round joined the 2 Divizia Națională sides seeded 9-10, Sfîntul Gheorghe and Spicul Chișcăreni. Steaua-57 Chișinău, Victoria Bardar and Socol Copceac received a bye for the second round. The home teams and the pairs for 2 Divizia Națională sides were determined in a draw held on 16 August 2017. Matches were played on 19 September 2017 and 3 October 2017.

Final stage

Bracket

Round of 16
The 5 winners from the previous round and Steaua-57 Chișinău, Victoria Bardar, Sokol Copceac joined the remaining 8 Divizia Națională sides seeded 1-8. The home teams and the pairs were determined in a draw held on 6 October 2017. Matches were played on 24 and 25 October 2017.

Quarter-finals
The 8 winners from the previous round entered the quarter-finals. The home teams were determined in a draw held on 27 October 2017. Matches were played on 18 April 2018.

Semi-finals
The 4 winners from the previous round entered the semi-finals. The home teams were determined in a draw held on 20 April 2018. Matches were played on 9 May 2018.

Final

The final was played on Wednesday 23 May 2018 at the Zimbru Stadium in Chișinău. The "home" team (for administrative purposes) was determined by an additional draw held on 10 May 2018.

References

External links
Cupa Moldovei on soccerway

Moldovan Cup seasons
Moldova